This is a list of notable integer sequences and their OEIS links.

General

Figurate numbers

Types of primes

Base-dependent

References
 OEIS core sequences

External links
 Index to OEIS

Integer
On-Line Encyclopedia of Integer Sequences